Amund Djuve  (born 28 April 1963) is a Norwegian journalist and newspaper editor.

He was born in Oslo, and graduated in business administration (siviløkonom) from the Norwegian School of Economics. In 1999 he was appointed chief editor for the newspaper Dagens Næringsliv. Being a newspaper for finance and business, during Djuve's leadership Dagens Næringsliv has also focused on investigative journalism, revealing corruption, fraud and money laundering.

References

1963 births
Living people
Journalists from Oslo
Norwegian newspaper editors
Norwegian School of Economics alumni